Sham Lal may refer to:
 Sham Lal (journalist), Indian literary critic and journalist
 Sham Lal (gymnast), Indian gymnast
 Sham Lal (politician), Pakistani politician
 Sham Lal Choudhary, Indian politician

See also
 Shyamlal